One More Time is a 1931 Warner Bros. Merrie Melodies cartoon directed by Rudolf Ising. The short was released on October 3, 1931, and stars Foxy as a Prohibition-era cop. This was Foxy's last theatrical appearance.

Plot

The cartoon shows police officer Foxy who deals with armed criminals, traffic violations, and Roxy's huge dog. The main action involves a group of gangsters kidnapping Roxy while making their getaway; Foxy chases them on a mechanical horse, rescues Roxy, and puts the criminals in jail—only to be shot in the back by a crow.

Home media
One More Time is available on disc 3 of the Looney Tunes Golden Collection: Volume 6.

References

External links

 
 
 
 

1931 films
1931 animated films
1931 comedy films
Merrie Melodies short films
American black-and-white films
Films scored by Frank Marsales
Films directed by Rudolf Ising
Foxy (Merrie Melodies) films
1930s police comedy films
Animated films about animals
Animated films about foxes
Warner Bros. Cartoons animated short films
1930s Warner Bros. animated short films